Plasmodium brodeni is a parasite of the genus Plasmodium subgenus Vinckeia. As in all Plasmodium species, P. brodeni has both vertebrate and insect hosts. The vertebrate hosts for this parasite are mammals.

Taxonomy
The parasite was first described by Rodhain at al. in 1913.

Distribution
This species is found in the Congo, Sudan and probably in other parts of Africa.

Hosts
The only known host is the elephant shrew (Petrodomus and Elephantulus species).

References

Further reading

 More details 

brodeni